Samuel Reed may refer to:

 Samuel B. Reed (1834–?), American architect
 Samuel M. Reed (1901–1996), American businessman